The 2000 Hel van het Mergelland was the 28th edition of the Volta Limburg Classic cycle race and was held on 8 April 2000. The race started and finished in Eijsden. The race was won by Bert Grabsch.

General classification

References

2000
2000 in road cycling
2000 in Dutch sport